Bréville-sur-Mer (literally Bréville on Sea) is a commune in the Manche department in Normandy in northwestern France.

Population

Sport
The Granville golf course is located here.

See also
Communes of the Manche department

References

Communes of Manche
Populated coastal places in France